Bekele (Amharic: በቀለ, Bek’ele) is an Ethiopian paternal name which may refer to:

Runners
Abebech Afework Bekele (born 1990), Ethiopian female half marathon runner
Alemitu Bekele Aga (born 1976), Ethiopian female long-distance runner competing for Belgium
Alemitu Bekele Degfa (born 1977), 5000 metres runner competing for Turkey
Alemu Bekele (born 1990), Ethiopian long-distance runner competing for Bahrain
Azmeraw Bekele (born 1986), Ethiopian marathon runner
Bekele Debele (born 1963), Ethiopian cross country runner and 1983 world champion
Bezunesh Bekele (born 1983), Ethiopian female marathon and cross-country runner
Helen Bekele Tola (born 1994), Ethiopian female long distance runner
Kenenisa Bekele (born 1982), distance runner who holds world and Olympic records
Mekdes Bekele (born 1987), 3000 metres steeplechase competitor
Tariku Bekele (born 1987), Ethiopian long-distance runner and brother of Kenenisa
Girma Bekele Gebre (born 1992), Ethiopian marathon runner

Others
Bekele Geleta (born 1944), secretary general of the International Red Cross
Bekele Gerba (born 1961), Oromo politician promoting political change by non-violence
Gelila Bekele (born 1984), model and social activist
Georges Bertrand Bekele, member of the Gabonese Democratic Party
Mulugeta Bekele (born 1947), Ethiopian physics professor
Sophia Bekele, business and corporate executive and writer
Shimelis Bekele, Ethiopian footballer
Tewodros Bekele (died 1977), Ethiopian trade unionist

Amharic-language names